Dubrovo is a rural locality (a selo) in Novlyanskoye Rural Settlement, Selivanovsky District, Vladimir Oblast, Russia. The population was 95 as of 2010. There are 4 streets.

Geography 
Dubrovo is located on the Ushna River, 15 km southeast of Krasnaya Gorbatka (the district's administrative centre) by road. Kondrakovo is the nearest rural locality.

References 

Rural localities in Selivanovsky District
Muromsky Uyezd